I'm Staying! is a 2003 French comedy film directed by Diane Kurys.

Cast 
 Sophie Marceau - Marie-Dominique Delpire
 Vincent Perez - Bertrand Delpire
 Charles Berling - Antoine
 Pascale Roberts - Mamyvonne, la mère de Marie-Do
 François Perrot - J.C.
 Hardy Krüger Jr. - John
 Colette Maire - Geneviève
 Sasha Alliel - Antoine, le fils
  - Le père de Marie-Do
 Jacques Duby - Le voisin du dessous
 Marie-France Mignal - La voisine du dessous

References

External links 

2003 comedy films
2003 films
French comedy films
2000s French films